Brunner is a German surname. It originated from the Middle High German word Brunne meaning spring or water well. It can also refer to people from places named Brunn. Notable people with the surname include:

 Alois Brunner (1912–2001), Austrian Nazi SS concentration camp war criminal
 Alex Brunner (born 1973) Italian footballer
 Arnold Brunner (1857–1925), American architect
 Benny Brunner  (born 1954), Israeli-Dutch filmmaker
 Carl Brunner von Wattenwyl (1823–1914), Swiss entomologist 
 Christiane Brunner (born 1947), Swiss politician and advocate
 Conrad Brunner (died 1410), Swiss Benedictine abbott
 Constantin Brunner, the pen-name of German philosopher Leopold Wertheimer
 Damien Brunner (born 1986), Swiss ice hockey player
 David Brunner (born 1835), a Democratic member of the U.S. House of Representatives from Pennsylvania
 Dominik Brunner (1959–2009), German manager
 Edouard Brunner (1932–2007), Swiss diplomat
 Elizabeth Irving Brunner (1904–2003), actress and founder of the Keep Britain Tidy Campaign
 Emil Brunner (1889–1966), Swiss theologian
 Fernand Brunner (1920–1991), Swiss philosopher
 Frank Brunner (born 1949), American comic book artist
 Greg Brunner, American-Swiss basketball player
 Heinrich Brunner (1840–1915), German historian
 Helena Brunner, Australian Paralympic swimmer
 Henry Brunner (1838–1916), English chemist
 Hugo Brunner, (born 1935) Lord Lieutenant of Oxfordshire, England
 Jean Brunner or Johann Josef Brunner (1804–1862),  Swiss born, French measuring instrument maker and mechanic.
 Jennifer L. Brunner (born 1957), Ohio Secretary of State
 Johann Conrad von Brunner (1653–1727), Swiss anatomist
 John K. H. Brunner (1934–1995), British science-fiction writer
 John Tomlinson Brunner (1842–1919), British industrialist and politician
 John Fowler Leece Brunner (1865–1929), British politician, son of the above
 Karl Brunner (1916–1989), monetarist economist
 Karl-Heinz Brunner (born 1953), German politician
 Lucas Brunner (born 1967), Swiss chess grandmaster
 Marisa Brunner (born 1982), Swiss football goalkeeper
 Martin Brunner (born 1963), Swiss football player
 Mary Brunner (born 1943), American former "Manson Family" member
 Michael Brunner (born 1995), Swiss curler
 Michelle Brunner (1953-2011), British bridge player
 Otto Brunner (1898–1982), Austrian historian
 Pat W. Brunner (1903-1971), American politician
 Robert Brunner (born 1958), American industrial designer
 Roland Brunner (born 1970), Austrian ice speed skater
 Thomas Brunner (1821–1874), surveyor and explorer
 Vratislav Hugo Brunner, Czech illustrator
 Walter Brunner (born 1948), Swiss building contractor
 William F. Brunner (1887–1965), New York City politician and U.S. congressional representative
 William Otto Brunner (1878–1958), Swiss astronomer

Fictional characters:
Hermann Brunner, a character from More Than Life at Stake

German-language surnames
German toponymic surnames